Lucihormetica luckae is a species of giant cockroach (Blaberidae) from Ecuador.

Light production
Like other species in the genus Lucihormetica, L. luckaes back carapace features one small and two large spots that glow when exposed to light (autofluorescence), perhaps to mimic the appearance of the toxic click beetle (Pyrophorus) that emits light at the same wavelength, in which case this would be an instance of Batesian mimicry. The evidence for genuine bioluminescence in Lucihormetica cockroaches is anecdotal and inconclusive, though there is evidence for autofluorescence.

Status
The species may be threatened, or even extinct, as only one specimen has ever been collected, some 70 years ago. In addition Tungurahua, the Ecuadorian volcano that served as the species' habitat, entered a new eruptive phase in 1999.

The species was listed among the Top 10 New Species 2012 as selected by the International Institute for Species Exploration at Arizona State University out of more than 140 nominated species.

In human culture
The back shell of L. luckae has been noted for its resemblance to Jawas, fictional creatures from the Star Wars science fiction media franchise.

References

Dubiously bioluminescent organisms
Cockroaches
Insects described in 2012
Species known from a single specimen